Jorge Luiz Frello Filho  (born 20 December 1991), known as Jorginho, is an Italian professional footballer who plays as a midfielder for  club Arsenal and the Italy national team. He operates as a defensive midfielder or a deep-lying playmaker, also known as a regista in Italian football.

Born in Brazil, Jorginho moved to Italy at the age of 15, and began his professional career with the Hellas Verona youth team, before being promoted to the senior team. During the 2010–11 season, he was sent on loan to Sambonifacese. In January 2014, he moved to Napoli, where he soon after won the Coppa Italia and the Supercoppa Italiana. He totalled 160 games for the club before signing for Chelsea in 2018, where he won the UEFA Europa League in his first season, followed by the UEFA Champions League during the 2020–21 season. After four and a half years at Chelsea, Jorginho joined Arsenal in 2023.

At international level, he has represented Italy, making his senior debut in 2016, while his competitive debut came the following year. He was part of the Italy squad which won UEFA Euro 2020, and was named in the Team of the Tournament for his performances. In 2021, he was named UEFA Men's Player of the Year and placed third in the Ballon d'Or.

Early life
Jorginho was born in Imbituba in the Brazilian state of Santa Catarina but moved to Italy at the age of 15. He is of Italian descent through his paternal great-grandfather Giacomo Frello who is from Lusiana, Veneto, and thus earned Italian citizenship as a result.

He has credited his mother with encouraging his love of football. After discovering that he was being financially exploited by his agent while playing for the Verona youth team, Jorginho almost quit the game and wanted to move back to Brazil, but credits an emotional phone call with his mother for inspiring him to persist and continue playing.

His childhood idol was Romanian player Gheorghe Hagi, which led to his friends nicknaming him Haginho.

Club career

Hellas Verona
Jorginho was a youth player of Hellas Verona. In June 2010, Jorginho was loaned out to Lega Pro Seconda Divisione club Sambonifacese, where he played his first full senior season for the Veneto club – appearing 31 times and scoring one goal whilst providing ten assists from his central midfield position.

He made his Verona debut on 4 September 2011, in a match against Sassuolo as a substitute in the 76th minute.

Napoli

On 18 January 2014, he joined Napoli in a co-ownership deal with Verona for four and a half years. On 12 February, he scored the last goal as Napoli overturned a 3–2 first-leg deficit to beat Roma and reach the 2014 Coppa Italia Final. In the final, on 3 May, Jorginho played the full 90 minutes as Napoli defeated Fiorentina 3–1.

In the 2014 Supercoppa Italiana in Doha on 22 December 2014, Jorginho entered the game against Juventus in the second half of extra time in place of Jonathan de Guzmán. He took Napoli's first spot-kick in the penalty shoot-out, and although Gianluigi Buffon saved it, Napoli were eventually victorious. While initially struggling to get into manager Rafael Benítez's line-up, Jorginho's fortunes changed with the appointment of Maurizio Sarri who was key to his development, deploying him in a deep-lying midfield role from which he could dictate play with his passing. In 2017–18, Jorginho had a breakthrough season with Napoli and was integral to their Serie A title challenge.

Chelsea

2018–19 season
On 14 July 2018, Jorginho signed for English team Chelsea on a five-year contract on the same day as Sarri was hired at the club. He joined for an initial transfer fee of £50 million, potentially rising to £57 million in add-ons. According to Napoli president Aurelio De Laurentiis, he was previously close to joining Manchester City. Jorginho made his debut on 5 August in the 2018 FA Community Shield at Wembley Stadium against that very opponent, and was booed by City fans in Chelsea's 2–0 loss. Six days later, he played his first Premier League match, in which he scored a penalty in a 3–0 win at Huddersfield Town. In Chelsea's third league match of the campaign, a 2–1 win away at Newcastle United, Jorginho completed 158 passes, which was a new record for most successful passes by a Chelsea player in a single match in the Premier League, and the second all-time in the league, behind İlkay Gündoğan's 167 completed passes for Manchester City against Chelsea from the prior season. Jorginho went on to break the attempted passes record in Chelsea's sixth league match of the season on 23 September, attempting 180 passes in a 0–0 draw away at West Ham United, breaking the record of 173 attempted passes again set by Gündoğan in the same Manchester City–Chelsea match the year before. On 24 February 2019, following a 0–0 draw after extra-time in the 2019 EFL Cup final against cup holders Manchester City, Jorginho missed Chelsea's first penalty in the resulting shoot-out, which ultimately saw Manchester City triumph 4–3. On 29 May, Jorginho featured in Chelsea's 4–1 victory over Arsenal in the 2019 UEFA Europa League final.

2019–20 season
In the 2019 UEFA Super Cup against Liverpool on 14 August, Jorginho scored the equalising goal from the penalty spot in extra-time an eventual 2–2 draw. The match subsequently went to a penalty shoot-out; although Jorginho was able to net Chelsea's first penalty, Liverpool ultimately won the shoot-out 5–4. He scored his first league goal of the season, also from the penalty spot, in a 2–0 home win over Brighton & Hove Albion on 28 September. On 5 November, he scored twice from the penalty spot as Chelsea came from behind to earn a 4–4 home draw against Ajax in the Champions League.

2020–21 season

Jorginho scored Chelsea's first goal of the season from the penalty spot in an eventual 3–1 league win against Brighton & Hove Albion on 14 September at Falmer Stadium. On 20 September, Jorginho missed his first penalty for Chelsea in the same match in which he made his 100th appearance for the club; the game ended 2–0 to Liverpool. On 3 October, he scored two penalties as Chelsea ran out 4–0 winners at home to Crystal Palace. He also led the team in goals in the Premier League, all coming from penalties.
On 29 May 2021, Jorginho won his first-ever Champions League with Chelsea, beating Manchester City 1–0 in the final.

2021–22 season
Jorginho came on as a substitute during the 2021 UEFA Super Cup against Villarreal on 12 August, which Chelsea won 6–5 on penalties. He took and scored the fifth penalty in the shoot-out. On 26 August 2021, Jorginho was named UEFA Men's Player of the Year Award beating out his Chelsea teammate, and UEFA Men's Midfielder of the year, N'Golo Kanté, as well as Manchester City midfielder, Kevin De Bruyne.

On 8 October, Jorginho was one of five Chelsea players included in the final 30-man shortlist for the 2021 Ballon d'Or. On 30 October, he converted a penalty in a 3–0 win away to Newcastle. In doing so, he became the first player in Premier League history to have 10 consecutive goals from the penalty spot. On 29 November, he placed third in the Ballon d'Or, behind winner Lionel Messi and Robert Lewandowski.

Jorginho started for Chelsea in the 1–0 semi-final victory over Al-Hilal in the 2021 FIFA Club World Cup on 9 February 2022, playing the first-half before coming off for N'Golo Kanté. He was an unused substitute as Chelsea beat Palmeiras in the final three days later to claim the Club World Cup title for the first time in the club's history.

Arsenal
Jorginho signed for Premier League club Arsenal on 31 January 2023 on a one-and-a-half-year contract with the option of a further year for a transfer fee of £12 million. He made his debut on 4 February as a 59th-minute substitute in Arsenal's 1–0 defeat away to Everton.

International career
As Jorginho holds both Italian and Brazilian citizenship, he was eligible to play for both the Italian and Brazilian national teams. In 2012, he was called up for the first time for Italy U21.

In 2014, Jorginho expressed his desire to represent Italy rather than Brazil internationally, and he received his first call up to the Italy senior squad in March 2016, under manager Antonio Conte, for the team's international friendlies against Spain and Germany. He made his international debut for Italy on 24 March, coming on as a last-minute substitute for Marco Parolo in a 1–1 draw against Spain at the Stadio Friuli in Udine. After initially being included in Conte's preliminary 30-man squad for UEFA Euro 2016, on 31 May, Jorginho was later excluded from the final 23-man squad.

Despite his positive club form for Napoli, Jorginho was not initially called up to the Italian side under Conte's successor, Gian Piero Ventura. Although rumours circled in the media regarding the possibility of Brazil's coach Tite calling Jorginho up to his squad in autumn 2017, as he had not yet appeared for Italy in a competitive match, Jorginho denied rumours that he wanted to switch to the Brazilian national team. He later made his first competitive appearance for Italy under manager Ventura in a 0–0 home draw against Sweden on 13 November, in the second leg of the World Cup play-offs against Sweden, at the San Siro in Milan; however, Italy's 1–0 away loss in the first leg on 10 November saw Sweden advance on aggregate, meaning that Italy had failed to qualify for the World Cup for the first time in 60 years.

On 7 September 2018, in Italy's first UEFA Nations League match at home to Poland in Bologna, Jorginho scored his first international goal from the penalty spot to secure a 1–1 draw. On 8 September 2019, he scored his second international goal, from the penalty spot once again, in a 2–1 away win over Finland, in a Euro 2020 qualifier. On 12 October, Jorginho scored his third international goal, once again from the penalty spot, in a 2–0 home win over Greece, which sealed Italy's qualification for Euro 2020. He scored his fourth international goal from the penalty spot once again on 18 November, in a 9–1 home win over Armenia in Italy's final Euro 2020 qualifier, also assisting Nicolò Zaniolo's second goal during the match.

In June 2021, he was included in Italy's squad for Euro 2020 by manager Roberto Mancini. On 6 July, following a 1–1 draw after extra-time against Spain in the semi-final of the competition, Jorginho scored the decisive penalty kick in the resulting shoot-out to send Italy to the final; during the match, he completed a tournament high of eight interceptions. In the final on 11 July against England at Wembley Stadium, after a 1–1 draw following extra time, his spot-kick was saved in the penalty shootout by Jordan Pickford, but Italy would go on to win 3–2 in the shootout after Bukayo Saka missed his penalty. Throughout the tournament, he covered the most ground of any player (86.6 km in total), made the most recoveries alongside Manuel Akanji (46), and completed the second most passes of any player after Aymeric Laporte (497 out of 529 attempted, with a 93% passing accuracy); he also won the most fouls (19) and made the most interceptions (25) of any other player, breaking Marcel Desailly's record of 24 interceptions in a single tournament from UEFA Euro 1996, since these statistics first began to be recorded at UEFA Euro 1980. For his performances, he was included in the team of the tournament.

Player profile

Style of play
Jorginho is known for his composure and versatility as a footballer, which allows him to be fielded in any midfield position. Due to his work-rate, technique, football intelligence, ability to break down possession, vision, and passing accuracy, he is usually deployed as central midfielder in a three-man midfield in a 4–3–3 formation. Although he is not imposing physically, due to his slender build and average height, he is also capable of playing both in a box-to-box role or in a defensive midfield role as a ball winner, courtesy of his tactical intelligence, positional sense, awareness, and ability to read the game, which enables him to cover ground, press opponents further up the pitch to retrieve the ball, intercept passes, and start attacking plays after winning back the ball. However, he usually operates in a more withdrawn creative role, as a deep-lying playmaker in front of the back-line, a position known as the regista role in Italian football jargon, which allows him more time on the ball to control the tempo of his team's play with his short, precise, horizontal passing game on the ground. Despite not being particularly quick and lacking significant pace, he is also known for his movement off the ball and ability to lose his markers, which allows him to find gaps from where he can receive his teammates' passes and link-up with them in tight spaces.

His role has also been likened to that of a metodista ("centre-half," in Italian football jargon), due to his ability to dictate play in midfield as well as assist his team defensively, in a similar manner to Xabi Alonso or Sergio Busquets. Although he is not known for his offensive capabilities, and has occasionally drawn criticism over his goalscoring and assist record, he is also an accurate penalty taker, who often performs trademark hop when taking spot kicks, with most of his goals coming from the penalty spot.

Jorginho cites Andrea Pirlo, Xavi, Ronaldo, and Ronaldinho as his footballing inspirations.

Reception 
Jorginho's nicknamed 'Il Professore' ('The Professor,' in Italian) or 'Radio Jorginho' by the players of the Italian national team, in reference to his leadership and organizational qualities, as well as for the way he directs the team and continuously talks during games.

For his performances with Chelsea and the Italian team in the 2021 season, Jorginho won UEFA Player of the Year. His Chelsea manager Thomas Tuchel described him as one of "the very best midfielders in the world."

Career statistics

Club

International

	

Scores and results list Italy's goal tally first, score column indicates score after each Jorginho goal

Honours
Napoli
Coppa Italia: 2013–14
Supercoppa Italiana: 2014

Chelsea
UEFA Champions League: 2020–21
UEFA Europa League: 2018–19
UEFA Super Cup: 2021
FIFA Club World Cup: 2021
FA Cup runner-up: 2019–20, 2020–21, 2021–22
EFL Cup runner-up: 2018–19, 2021–22

Italy
UEFA European Championship: 2020
UEFA Nations League third place: 2020–21

Individual
UEFA Europa League Squad of the Season: 2018–19
UEFA Champions League Squad of the Season: 2020–21
UEFA European Championship Team of the Tournament: 2020
UEFA Men's Player of the Year: 2020–21
FIFA FIFPro World11: 2021

Orders
Knight of the Order of Merit of the Italian Republic: 2021

Notes

References

External links

Profile at the Arsenal F.C. website
Profile at the Italian Football Federation website 

1991 births
Living people
Sportspeople from Santa Catarina (state)
Brazilian footballers
Italian footballers
Association football midfielders
Hellas Verona F.C. players
A.C. Sambonifacese players
S.S.C. Napoli players
Chelsea F.C. players
Arsenal F.C. players
Serie B players
Serie A players
Premier League players
FA Cup Final players
UEFA Europa League winning players
UEFA Champions League winning players
UEFA Men's Player of the Year Award winners
Italy international footballers
UEFA Euro 2020 players
UEFA European Championship-winning players
Brazilian expatriate footballers
Italian expatriate footballers
Expatriate footballers in England
Brazilian expatriate sportspeople in England
Italian expatriate sportspeople in England
Brazilian people of Italian descent
Brazilian people of Venetian descent
Citizens of Italy through descent
Brazilian emigrants to Italy
Knights of the Order of Merit of the Italian Republic